The Great Mosque of Kano is a general Jumaat mosque in Kano, the capital city of Kano State and the second most populous city in Nigeria. The mosque is situated at around the Heart of the city around the Mandawari area of the state.

History

The great mosque of Kano is the oldest mosque in Nigeria was built for Muhammad Rumfa in the 15th century. It was made of mud, and was of the soro, or tower, variety. It was moved to a new site by Muhammad Zaki in 1582, and rebuilt in the mid 19th century by Abdullahi Dan Dabo It was destroyed in the 1950s, and rebuilt with British sponsorship.

See also
  Lists of mosques 
  List of mosques in Africa
  List of mosques in Egypt

References

External links
Photographs of the mosque

Buildings and structures in Kano
Mosques in Nigeria
15th-century mosques
Mosques completed in 1582
Grand mosques